Tazehabad Kola (also Romanized as Tāzehābād Kolā; also known as Tāzehābād) is a village in Qareh Toghan Rural District, in the Central District of Neka County, Mazandaran Province, Iran. At the 2006 census, its population was 1,916, in 503 families.

References 

Populated places in Neka County